Daxin is a town under the administration of Fugou County, Henan, China. , it has 22 villages under its administration:
Xinnan Village
Xinbei Village
Xulou Village
Zhujia Village
Nanwaliu Village
Liufangyu Village
Sihouliu Village
Wawu Village
Jianglao Village
Jiangshaoye Village
Chentang Village
Jiangguozhuang Village
Heyanliu Village
Baidanggang Village
Sigang Village
Pojia Village
Zhengying Village
Chenlou Village
Jiaxiaozhuang Village
Yangzhuang Village
Huotang Village
Xuanxiling Village

References 

Township-level divisions of Henan
Fugou County